Anthony Best (born March 20, 1968) professionally known as Buckwild, is an American hip hop record producer. Hailing from The Bronx borough of New York City, he is a member of Diggin' in the Crates Crew, along with Lord Finesse, Showbiz and A.G., Diamond D, Fat Joe, Big L, and O.C. He has produced a number of tracks for prominent rappers in the music industry, including The Notorious B.I.G.'s "I Got a Story to Tell" and Black Rob's "Whoa!". In 2013, he was described by HipHopDX as "one of Hip Hop's most prolific and acclaimed producers".

Career
In 2010, Buckwild released Nineteen Ninety Now, a collaborative album with Celph Titled. In 2014, he released a collaborative album with Meyhem Lauren, titled Silk Pyramids.

Discography

Studio albums
Nineteen Ninety Now (2010) (with Celph Titled)
Silk Pyramids (2014) (with Meyhem Lauren)
 Trafficanté (2019) (with Pounds)
 No Expiration Date (2022) (with Artifacts)

Compilation albums
Buckwild: Diggin' in the Crates (2007)
Nineteen Ninety More (2011) (with Celph Titled)
Music Is My Religion (2020)

EPs
Still Diggin' Composition EP (1998)
Buckwild Presents... (2010)
Silk Pyramids Extras EP (2014) (with Meyhem Lauren)
Fully Loaded (2020)

Productions

2020

Buckwild - Fully Loaded (Buckwild album) 
 01. "Oleander (feat. Chuck Strangers)"
 02. "Violent Man (feat. Nick Grant)"
 03. "YFN (feat. Meyhem Lauren & Raekwon)" 
 04. "Ease Up (feat. Little Brother)" 
 05. "Fully Loaded (ft. Rome Streetz and Rim)" 
 06. "Mad Rich (feat. Madhattan)" 
 07. "Never Fold (feat. Fly Anakin) " 
 08. "Real Niggaz (feat. Rasheed Chappell)"
 09. "Green Paper (feat. Chris & Whisper)" 
 10. "More Life (feat. Asun Eastwood)"

1994 
O.C. - "Word...Life", "O-Zone", "Born 2 Live", "Time's Up", "Point O' Viewz", "Let It Slide", "Ma Dukes" and "Outtro (Sabotage)" from Word...Life (1994)
Artifacts - "C'mon Wit Da Git Down", "Attack of New Jeruzalum", "What Goes On" and "C'mon Wit Da Git Down (Remix)" from Between a Rock and a Hard Place (1994) 
Organized Konfusion - "Stress", "Thirteen" and "Why" from Stress: The Extinction Agenda (1994)
Beastie Boys - "Get It Together (Buck-Wild Remix)" (1994)
Brand Nubian - "Alladat" from Everything Is Everything (1994)
Big L feat. Kid Capri - "Put It On" from Lifestylez ov da Poor & Dangerous (1994)

1995 
Big L - "8 Iz Enuff", "Danger Zone" and "Da Graveyard" from Lifestylez ov da Poor & Dangerous (1995)
Little Indian - "One Little Indian" from "One Little Indian VLS" (1995)
AZ - "Ho Happy Jackie" from Doe or Die (1995)
Mic Geronimo - "Masta I.C.", "Three Stories High" and "Train of Thought" from The Natural (1995)
Kool G Rap - "Blowin' Up in the World" and "Fast Life" from 4,5,6 (1995)

1996 
Mad Skillz - "VA in the House", "Doin' Time in the Cypha" and "Get Your Groove On" from From Where??? (1996)
Sadat X - "The Lump Lump" and "Smoking on the Low" from Wild Cowboys (1996)
Street Smartz - "Problemz" (1996)

1997 
Capone-N-Noreaga - "Neva Die Alone" and "Black Gangstas" from The War Report (1997)
Organized Konfusion - "Shugah Shorty" and "Invetro" from The Equinox (1997)
Diamond D - "On Stage" from Hatred, Passions and Infidelity (1997)
Mic Geronimo - "How You Been?" from Vendetta (1997)
The Notorious B.I.G. - "I Got a Story to Tell" from Life After Death (1997)
Royal Flush - "I Been Gettin' So Much $", "Niggas Night Out" and "Makin' Moves" from Ghetto Millionaire (1997)
O.C. - "The Chosen One", "Far from Yours" and "Hypocrite" from Jewelz (1997)
Jay-Z - "Lucky Me" from In My Lifetime, Vol. 1 (1997)

1998 
Big Pun - "Dream Shatterer" from Still Diggin' Composition (1998)
Brand Nubian - "Brand Nubian" and "Maybe One Day" from Foundation (1998)
Fat Joe - "Walk on By" from Don Cartagena (1998)

1999 
Akinyele - "Sister, Sister" from Aktapuss (1999)
A.G. - "All Eye Seeing" and "Kurupt Money" from The Dirty Version (1999)
Mase - "Another Story to Tell" from Double Up (1999)
Terror Squad - "Rudeboy Salute" from The Album (1999)
Black Rob - "Whoa!" from Life Story (1999)

2000 
Big Pun - "Nigga Shit" from Yeeeah Baby (2000)
Beanie Sigel - "What a Thug About" from The Truth (2000)

2001 
O.C. - "Back to Cali", "Soul to Keep", "Bon Appetit", "Get It Dirty", "Utmost", "Respect da Drop", "Weed & Drinks", "Paradise", "Psalm 23" and "Bonafide" 
from Bon Appetit (2001)
Faith Evans - "I Love You" from Faithfully (2001)
P. Diddy & The Bad Boy Family - "So Complete" from The Saga Continues... (2001)
Fat Joe - "My Lifestyle" and "Still Real" from Jealous Ones Still Envy (J.O.S.E.) (2001)
Kool G Rap - "The Streets" (2001)
Big L - "How Will I Make It" from Harlem's Finest - A Freestyle History - Volume 2

2002 
AZ - " I'm Back" and "Rebirth" from Aziatic (2002)
WC - "So Hard" from Ghetto Heisman (2002)
Cormega - "A Thin Line" from The True Meaning (2002)
Fat Joe - "Take a Look at My Life" from Loyalty (2002)
Kool G Rap - "Holla Back" from The Giancana Story (2002)

2003 
Lumidee - "Only for Your Good" from Almost Famous (2003)
702 - "Better Day (Ghetto Girl)" from Star (2003)

2004 
Nas - "These Are Our Heroes" from Street's Disciple (2004)
Terror Squad - "Pass Away" from True Story (2004)

2005 
50 Cent - "I Don't Need 'Em" from The Massacre (2005)
The Game - "Like Father, Like Son" from The Documentary (2005)
Beanie Sigel - "Look at Me Now" from The B. Coming (2005)
I-20 & Playaz Circle - "You Ain't Got Enough" from Disturbing tha Peace (2005)

2006 
Remy Ma - "She's Gone" from There's Something About Remy: Based on a True Story (2006)

2007 
Playaz Circle - "U Can Believe It" from Supply & Demand (2007)

2008 
Termanology - "Respect My Walk" from Politics as Usual (2008)
Immortal Technique - "Stronghold Grip" from The 3rd World (2008)

2009 
Jadakiss - "Pain & Torture" from The Last Kiss (2009)
Method Man & Redman - "Mrs. International" from Blackout! 2 (2009)
Cormega - "Mega Fresh X" from Born and Raised (2009)

2010 
Sadat X - "Long Years" from Wild Cowboys II (2010)
Capone-N-Noreaga - "With Me" from The War Report 2: Report the War (2010)

2011 
Saigon - "Oh Yeah (Our Babies)" from The Greatest Story Never Told (2011)

2012 
Nas - "You Wouldn't Understand" from Life Is Good (2012)
Maino - "Nino Brown" from The Day After Tomorrow (2012)

2013 
R.A. the Rugged Man - "Still Diggin Wit Buck (Legends Intro)" and "Media Midgets" from Legends Never Die (2013)
Papoose - "Cure" from The Nacirema Dream (2013)

2015 
DJ EFN - "Revolutionary Ride Music" from Another Time (2015)
Ea$y Money - "Money & Blood" from The Motive of Nearly Everybody, Yo (2015)

2016 
Reks - "Jump Shots" from The Greatest X (2016)
Vinnie Paz - "The Void" from The Cornerstone of the Corner Store (2016)
Termanology - "I Dream B.I.G." (featuring Sheek Louch and Styles P) from More Politics (2016)

2018 
Apathy - "A View of Hell (Hell of a View)" from The Widow's Son (2018)

References

External links

 

American hip hop record producers
African-American record producers
Diggin' in the Crates Crew members
East Coast hip hop musicians
Musicians from the Bronx
Living people
American hip hop DJs
1968 births
Record producers from New York (state)